The College View Historic District is a national historic district located north of East Carolina University at Greenville, Pitt County, North Carolina. The district encompasses 343 contributing buildings in a predominantly residential section of Greenville.  It includes buildings dated from about 1909 to World War II and notable examples of Bungalow / American Craftsman, Colonial Revival, and Tudor Revival architecture.  Notable buildings include St. Paul's Episcopal Church (1930), the Rotary Club Building (1921), Chancellor's Residence (former William H. Dail Jr. House, 1921–1930), William Harrington House, Bateman House (1910), Franklin Vines Johnston House (1923), and Dr. Paul Fitzgerald House (1929).

In March 1992, College View was listed on the National Register of Historic Places.

See also
 List of Registered Historic Places in North Carolina

External links
 City of Greenville - Historic Preservation

References

Historic districts on the National Register of Historic Places in North Carolina
Colonial Revival architecture in North Carolina
Tudor Revival architecture in North Carolina
Neighborhoods in Greenville, North Carolina
National Register of Historic Places in Greenville, North Carolina